The Voice of Khmer Youth is a weekly newspaper published in Cambodia.

See also
List of newspapers in Cambodia

Newspapers published in Cambodia